Henry M. Warner (1809 – April 7, 1875) was a member of the Wisconsin State Assembly.

Biography
Warner was born in 1809 in Connecticut, lived in Cottage Grove, Wisconsin, and then moved to Black Earth. He died on April 7, 1875, at Black Earth.

Career
Warner was a member of the Assembly during the 1st Wisconsin Legislature in 1848, representing the 1st District of Dane County, Wisconsin. Additionally, he was a member of the County Board and was Overseer of the Poor. He was a Democrat.

References

External links

People from Cottage Grove, Wisconsin
County supervisors in Wisconsin
1809 births
1875 deaths
19th-century American politicians
People from Black Earth, Wisconsin
Democratic Party members of the Wisconsin State Assembly